APG Airlines is a French airline based at Toulouse, France. It operates flights between Toulouse Blagnac Airport  and Lorient Airport.

References

External links 
 

Airlines of France